Mohamed Baïlou (born 3 March 1991) is a Burkinabé professional footballer who plays as a goalkeeper for Djibouti Premier League club Gendarmerie Nationale. He previously played in the Ghanaian Premier League for Ashanti Gold.

Club career 
Baïlou has had stints with Burkinabé Premier League teams RC Bobo Dioulasso, ASF Bobo Dioulasso and Salitas FC. In 2018, he signed a two-year deal with Ivory Coast Ligue 1 team Racing Club Abidjan.

Ashanti Gold 
In October 2020, after the expiration of his contract with Racing Club Abidjan, Baïlou joined the Ghana Premier league Obuasi-based team Ashanti Gold on a free transfer. He was a member of the squad that featured for the club in the 2020–21 CAF Confederation Cup. In the 2020–21 Ghana Premier League season he served as the main goalkeeper of the club as Felix Atuquaye Clottey served as the second. He made 9 appearances in the first round of the season, against Clottey's two. Baïlou played two matches for the Miners in the 2021 Ghanaian FA Cup in their route to the finals. He played in their round of 16 match against Aduana Stars which ended in a 4–2 victory and their quarter-final match against Kintampo Top Talent which ended in a 2–1 victory. Ashanti Gold however lost the finals to Accra Hearts of Oak leaving Baïlou with a silver medal at the end of the season. In total he played thirteen matches for the club and kept four clean sheets.

Gendarmerie Nationale 
In August 2021, Baïlou joined Djibouti Premier League club Gendarmerie Nationale.

International career 
Baïlou featured for the Burkina Faso national under-23 football team in the past. He has three international caps for Burkina Faso national football team, making his debut and keeping the post in an international friendly against Kazakhstan on 12 May 2015.

Honours 
RC Bobo Dioulasso

 Burkinabé Premier League: 2014–15
 Coupe du Faso: 2014
 Burkinabé Super Cup: 2014

Salitas

 Coupe du Faso: 2018
Racing Club Abidjan

 Ligue 1 Ivory Coast: 2019–20

Ashanti Gold

 Ghanaian FA Cup runner-up: 2021

References

External links 

 

1991 births
Living people
Ashanti Gold SC players
Burkinabé footballers
Ghana Premier League players
RC Bobo Dioulasso players
ASF Bobo Dioulasso players
Association football goalkeepers
Salitas FC players
21st-century Burkinabé people